The so-called Apocalypse of Samuel of Kalamoun is a Coptic text of uncertain date and authorship now preserved only in its Arabic translation. It contains the strongest denunciation of the language shift in the Middle Ages of Egypt, by which Coptic was replaced by Arabic. It records that the Christians in Egypt, or at least those of the author's world; since the arabization of lower Egypt preceded that of Upper Egypt as mentioned by Ibn Hawqal in the late 10th century, were becoming increasingly Arabized in culture and customs, although actual conversion to Islam does not seem to be a concern.

The date of the text depends on the interpretation of the list of "predicted" Arab kings which it contains. These seem to be the Fatimid caliphs, and the work should therefore be dated to the crusader period. However it has been dated as early as the 8th century. The author of the work is supposedly the 7th century monk Samuel of Kalamoun.

The text is edited with a French translation in an unsatisfactory edition by J. Ziadeh.

References

External links
 Introduction to translation
 Translation of whole work
 Excerpt of work online

Egypt under the Fatimid Caliphate
Coptic history
Coptic literature
Language activists